Santa Maria del Soccorso a Capodimonte is a Neoclassic-style Roman Catholic church in the Capodimonte Neighborhood of Naples, Italy.

The interior is centralized and has a cupola frescos with a starry sky. On the lateral apse are frescos depicting the Death of St Joseph and the Agony of Christ in the Garden of Gesthemane. In the apse ceiling is a fresco of the Trinity by Vincenzo Galloppi. The main altarpiece depicting the Virgin of Succor (1879) was painted by Giuseppe Mancinelli. There is a second church dedicated to Santa Maria del Soccorso, called Maria del Soccorso all’Arenalle.

References

Roman Catholic churches in Naples
Neoclassical architecture in Naples
19th-century Roman Catholic church buildings in Italy
Neoclassical church buildings in Italy